The 1988–89 season was Heart of Midlothian F.C.s 6th consecutive season of play in the Scottish Premier Division. Hearts also competed in the UEFA Cup, Scottish Cup and the Scottish League Cup.

Fixtures

Friendlies

Uefa Cup

League Cup

Scottish Cup

Scottish Premier Division

Scottish Premier Division table

Squad information

|}

See also
List of Heart of Midlothian F.C. seasons

References

Statistical Record

External links
Official Club website

Heart of Midlothian F.C. seasons
Heart of Midlothian